The 2020–21 Washington State Cougars men's basketball team represented Washington State University during the 2020–21 NCAA Division I men's basketball season. The team is led by second-year head coach Kyle Smith. The Cougars played their home games at the Beasley Coliseum in Pullman, Washington as members in the Pac-12 Conference.

Previous season
The Cougars finished the 2019–20 season  16–16, 6–12 in Pa-12 play to finish in 11th place. They defeated Colorado in the first round of the Pac-12 tournament and were set to face Arizona State in the quarterfinals before the remainder of the Pac-12 Tournament was cancelled amid the COVID-19 pandemic. On March 12, all other conference tournaments and postseason tournaments were cancelled, making the Cougars win over Colorado on March 11 the final game to be completed in the 2019–20 basketball season.

Offseason

Departures

Incoming transfers

2020 recruiting class

Roster

Schedule and results

|-
!colspan=9 style=| Regular season

|-
!colspan=9 style=| Pac-12 Tournament

Source:

References

Washington State
Washington State Cougars men's basketball seasons
Washington State
Washington State